Timthal Baghdad ('Baghdad's Statue') is a public monument in Baghdad, created by the sculptor Mohammed Ghani Hikmat (1929–2011) and inaugurated in 2013. It is a tall column with a woman dressed in Abbasid costume sitting on the top. The column is inscribed with Arabic letters, taken from a famous Arabic poem by the eminent poet Mustafa Jamal al-Din. The statue is intended to glorify both the city and its ancient heritage.

Background

In 2010, the Mayor of Baghdad commissioned the sculptor, Mohammed Ghani Hikmat, to complete a series of four monuments as part of a Baghdad Culture program. The artist began work on four new sculptures to be erected in various locations around Baghdad. However, this would be his final project, for the sculptor died before it was completed. Ghani's son oversaw the completion of the project. His most well-known works include a pair of statues of Queen Scheherazade and King Shahryar, located on the banks of the Tigris River, near Abu Nuwas Street and the Fountain of Kahramana in Baghdad's central business district. The choice of location for his works was important to Ghani, who wanted the sculptures to be accessible to all. He avoided public squares and gardens, and instead wanted his works to be situated in the streets and on the sides of buildings.

Description

The first of the three sculptures inaugurated in 2013 was Timthal Baghdad ('Baghdad’s Statue'). It is a column featuring a lady sitting on a chair wearing Abbasid traditional clothes and is located in Andalusia square (Al Andalus). The overall height of the column is 13.5 metres (10.5 metre base and 3 metres for the figure), making it one of the tallest monuments in the city centre.

The column features Arabic calligraphy along its length, specifically poetry by Mustafa Jamal al-Din glorifying the city of Baghdad. The verse reads in part:

The figure of the Abbasid woman is reclining, with her back to the sun, so that she is looking towards the horizon in front of her. The woman is intended to signify that the country's ancestors were from the East. This reference is another reference objectively tied to the base of the monument.

Specifications

 Monument name: Timthal Baghdad ('Baghdad's Statue')
 Monument type: Column
 Materials: Stone and bronze 
 Height: 3m plus 10.5m base (Total= 13.5 m)
 Location: Andalus Square, Baghdad 
 Date constructed: 2010–2013
 Official inauguration: 2013  (pictured)
 Designer and builder: Mohammed Ghani Hikmat

See also

 Iraqi art
 Hurufiyya movement

References

Arabic art
Iraqi art
Monuments and memorials in Iraq
Tourist attractions in Baghdad
2013 sculptures
2013 establishments in Iraq
Sculptures of women